Tebbit is a surname. Notable people with the surname include:

 Albert Tebbit (1871–1938), British speed skater
 Donald Tebbit (1920–2010), British diplomat
 Kevin Tebbit (born 1946), British civil servant
 Margaret Tebbit (1934–2020), wife of Norman Tebbit
 Norman Tebbit (born 1931), British politician (now Baron Tebbit)

See also
 Tebbitt, a surname
 Ellen Tebbits, a 1951 children's novel